The 1987 Pacific Tigers football team represented the University of the Pacific (UOP) in the 1987 NCAA Division I-A football season as a member of the Pacific Coast Athletic Association.

The team was led by head coach Bob Cope, in his fifth year, and played home games at Pacific Memorial Stadium in Stockton, California. They finished the season with a record of four wins and seven losses (4–7, 3–4 PCAA). The Tigers were outscored by their opponents 174–252 over the season.

Schedule

Notes

References

Pacific
Pacific Tigers football seasons
Pacific Tigers football